S.T.A.K.E. (short for Special Threat Assessment for Known Extranormalities) is a fictional organization appearing in American comic books published by Marvel Comics.

Publication history
S.T.A.K.E. first appeared in S.H.I.E.L.D. Vol. 3 #9 and was created by Al Ewing and Stefano Caselli.

Fictional character biography

S.T.A.K.E. is a subsidiary of S.H.I.E.L.D. that specializes in handling the supernatural occurrences. S.H.I.E.L.D. Director Maria Hill rebuilt the advanced Life Model Decoy of Dum Dum Dugan to work for S.T.A.K.E. where he met Warwolf and Dr. Paul Kraye who worked on some secret projects before Dum Dum Dugan arrived. In his first job with S.T.A.K.E., Dum Dum Dugan worked with Jasper Sitwell's zombie form and Warwolf when an unidentified organization controlled Teen Abomination into attacking Oakland Airport. After using his scanning abilities to detect the chip in Teen Abomination's skull, Dum Dum Dugan had Jasper Sitwell shoot the part of the skull that had the chip in it and Teen Abomination was brought into their care.

Upon getting the approval, Dum Dum Dugan and S.T.A.K.E. formed an incarnation of the Howling Commandos with Warwolf being their supervisor and consisting of Jasper Sitwell's zombie form, Vampire by Night, Man-Thing, Manphibian, Orrgo, Teen Abomination, and Hit-Monkey. Their first mission involved the Earth Idol of Golthana that was being smuggled on the S.S. Chaney and turned its crew into humanoid plant monsters. While the Howling Commandos were successful in defeating the transformed crew members, they merged into one giant plant monster. Man-Thing used his touch to burn the giant plant monster where its link to the Earth Idol of Golthana caused it to burn as well. The next mission that S.T.A.K.E gives to the Howling Commandos involves them fighting Sphinx and Adversary which led to them getting Glyph on their team.

During the Avengers: Standoff! storyline, Paul Kraye caught Orrgo going through some S.T.A.K.E. files and informed Maria Hill enough for Orrgo to be sent to Pleasant Hill. The rest of the Howling Commandos rescued Orrgo and were teleported back to S.T.A.K.E. HQ by Kobik where they found that Paul Kraye had released every monstrous inmate there. This causes the Howling Commandos to spring into action.

Old Man Logan encounters the Howling Commandos who mistake him for a vampire and attack him. After the misunderstanding is cleared. Warwolf informs Logan of their war with Dracula. Dracula has been psychically calling all vampires to his castle, which Logan deduces must include Jubilee. The Howling Commandos attack Dracula's castle while Logan sneaks in but are subdued by his army led by Vampire by Night who is under Dracula's control. Logan finds Jubilee who, also under Dracula's control, begs him to save her. Just as he lets his guard down, Dracula attacks Logan from behind, biting him. Logan fights Dracula as his healing factor fights off the vampirism. Dracula easily beats the weakened Logan who then passes out. Logan wakes up in the dungeon along with the Howling Cammandos. As Dracula taunts them, Jubilee begins resisting his control. Logan encourages her to fight back just before Man-Thing and Orrgo break in to free everyone. Dracula threatens to kill Jubilee as Logan approaches him. Now free from his control, Jubilee throws Dracula towards Logan, who then impales him. After a brief scuffle, Orrgo grabs Dracula and exposes him to the sun. Logan then proceeds to decapitate Dracula, freeing his thralls. Logan instructs Cerebra to throw Dracula's head into the sun in order to prevent or at the very least, delay his resurrection. Later, Logan spends time with Jubilee and Shogo over dinner.

Members
 Warwolf/Martin Reyna - Supervisor
 Paul Kraye - A S.H.I.E.L.D. Science Tech Division member
 Dum Dum Dugan L.M.D. - Life Model Decoy of Dum Dum Dugan.
 Howling Commandos - S.T.A.K.E's incarnation of the group.
 Glyph - 
 Hit-Monkey - 
 Jasper Sitwell - The zombie of the S.H.I.E.L.D. Agent Sitwell.
 Man-Thing - 
 Manphibian - 
 Orrgo - 
 Teen Abomination - The son of Happy Hogan.
 Vampire by Night -

References

External links
 S.T.A.K.E. at Marvel Wiki
 S.T.A.K.E. at Comic Vine

Fictional organizations in Marvel Comics
Fictional intelligence agencies
S.H.I.E.L.D.